Mihail Kanstantsinavich Harbachow ((Mikhail Gorbachev); born 29 July 1983) is a Belarusian former professional footballer.

In July 2020 Harbachow was found guilty of being involved in a match-fixing schema in Belarusian league. He was sentenced to 2 years of house arrest and banned from Belarusian football for life.

Honours
Belshina Bobruisk
Belarusian Premier League champion: 2001

Naftan Novopolotsk
Belarusian Cup winner: 2008–09, 2011–12

References

External links

1983 births
Living people
Sportspeople from Mogilev Region
Belarusian footballers
Association football defenders
FC RUOR Minsk players
FC Naftan Novopolotsk players
FC Belshina Bobruisk players
FC Lida players